The Iolaini are a tribe of butterflies in the family Lycaenidae.

Genera

As not all Theclinae have been assigned to tribes, the following list of genera is preliminary:

 Britomartis
 Bullis
 Charana
 Creon
 Dacalana
 Etesiolaus
 Iolaus - includes Argiolaus, Epamera, Iolaphilus
 Jacoona
 Maneca
 Manto
 Mantoides
 Matsutaroa
 Neocheritra
 Paruparo
 Pratapa
 Purlisa
 Rachana - formerly Eliotia (preoccupied)
 Stugeta
 Suasa
 Sukidion
 Tajuria
 Tanuetheira
 Thrix
 Trichiolaus

References 

 
Butterfly tribes